The Middletown–Portland railroad bridge is a swing truss bridge crossing the Connecticut River and Route 9 in Middletown, Connecticut, just south of the Arrigoni Bridge. The center span rotates to allow vessels to pass through. It carried the Boston and New York Air-Line Railroad over the river to Portland, Connecticut, and continues to serve Providence & Worcester Railroad customers in Portland. Since the bridge is usually left open, it may appear inactive. However, trains regularly cross the river carrying paper products and demolition debris. In 2017, a train that had just crossed the bridge derailed on the Middletown side near Johnson Street; no injuries were reported.

The bridge was featured prominently in the video for the 1993 Billy Joel hit "The River of Dreams".  Joel and three backup singers appear throughout the video standing on the western span of the bridge, with the open center section of the bridge behind them.

See also 
 List of crossings of the Connecticut River

References

External links 

 
 YouTube: Billy Joel's The River of Dreams music video
 Carry Me Across the Water: Our Historic Bridges

Bridges over the Connecticut River
Railroad bridges in Connecticut
Buildings and structures in Middletown, Connecticut
Portland, Connecticut
Bridges in Middlesex County, Connecticut
Truss bridges in the United States
Metal bridges in the United States
Swing bridges in the United States
Providence and Worcester Railroad